Dimitrije Banjac (born 6 July 1976) is a Serbian actor, comedian and screenwriter. Together with Nikola Škorić and Dejan Ćirjaković he is the creator and actor of several popular Serbian television show programs, including Noćna smena, Velika Srbija, Srbi u svemiru, Pravi fudbal and Državni posao. Audiences in Serbia know him best for his roles as Professor Kišprdilov in Noćna smena and Đorđe Čvarkov in Državni posao.

Early life
Banjac was born in Novi Sad. He has a degree in engineering.

Career

Early work: 2008–2011 
Banjac started working on television as a sports journalist.

He later started making sketches for the television series Noćna smena, in which he also starred, as Kišprdilov.

Državni posao: 2012 
In 2012 Banjac, alongside Nikola Škorić and Dejan Ćirjaković created Državni posao (The Government Job), which aired on RTV Vojvodina.

The show was a massive success and is currently one of the most watched shows in the Balkans.

Continued success: 2013–2016 
Banjac, Škorić and Ćirjaković continued to collaborate, and in 2013 they created Velika Srbija and Srbi u Svemiru. Both shows aired on RTV Vojvodina and were, unlike their previous work, met with a mixed reception from critics and audiences.

2017–present 
In 2017, Banjac, along with Nikola Škorić, appeared in Haris Planinčić's 0007, reprising his role as Đorđe Čvarkov from Državni posao. He continued to collaborate with Planinčić, appearing in Boldt, playing Rile.

Personal life
Banjac is married and has two children.

He is also an avid comic book collector, stating his favorite comic book is Alan Ford.

Filmography

Film

Television

References

External sources
 Velika Srbija at b92.net 
 Državni posao at 24sata.rs 
 Noćna smena at rss.me 
 Državni posao at rtv.rs 
 Dimitrije Banjac: ˝Komedija je došla sasvim slučajno˝ at ilovenovisad.com 

Serbian comedians
Serbian male television actors
Living people
Actors from Novi Sad
1976 births